Stobreč is a historical village and now a tourist resort on the Adriatic Sea, in central Dalmatia, Croatia. Administratively it is part of the city of Split. Founded as Epetium, Stobreč has been settled since the classical antiquity founded as an Ancient Greek colony on the Illyrian coast.

The largest body of recorded ancient history in the vicinity of Stobreč relates to the development of Diocletian's Palace, now within the present day city of Split. Diocletian founded this palace upon his retirement as Roman Emperor.

The sarcophagus of Lucius Artorius Castus, a Roman prefect thought to possibly be one of the inspirations for some of the legends of King Arthur, was discovered in Stobreč.

Notable people
Velimir Perasović, basketball coach and former player
Alain Blažević, actor

See also
Diocletian's Palace

References

Split, Croatia
Populated places in Split-Dalmatia County
Populated coastal places in Croatia
Illyrian Croatia
Greek colonies in Illyria